Irvine is a Scottish surname, which also became a given name. It is derived from the area of river Irvine in Scotland. Notable people with the name include:

Surname 
Acheson Irvine (1837–1916), Canadian police commissioner
Alan Irvine (footballer born 1958) (born 1958), Scottish footballer and manager
Alan Irvine (footballer born 1962) (born 1962), Scottish footballer
Alexander C. Irvine (born 1969), American writer
Andrew Irvine (disambiguation), several people
Archie Irvine (born 1946), Scottish footballer
Arthur Irvine (1909–1978), British politician
Barbara Haney Irvine (born 1944), American advocate for the preservation of women's historic sites
Bill and Bobbie Irvine (1926–2008 and 1932–2004), British ballroom dancers
Bobby Irvine (footballer born 1900) (1900–1979), Irish footballer
Bobby Irvine (footballer born 1942) (born 1942), Irish footballer 
Brian Irvine (composer) (born 1965), Northern Irish composer
Brian Irvine (footballer), Scottish footballer
Bulldog Irvine (1853–1897), Scottish rugby union footballer
Byron Irvine (born 2005), Australia 
 Christopher Irvine (born 1970), American-born Canadian professional wrestler better known as Chris Jericho
Daniel Irvine (born 1982), Australian rugby league footballer
Daryl Irvine (born 1964), American baseball pitcher 
David Irvine (blackjack player), engineer and blackjack player
David Irvine (Canadian politician) (1835–1924), Irish-born farmer and political figure in Canada
David Irvine (diplomat) (born 1947), Australian diplomat
Del Irvine (1892–1916), Canadian ice hockey player
Derry Irvine (born 1940), British lawyer
Don Irvine (born 1954), Canadian canoer 
Duncan Irvine, Scottish rugby union footballer
Eddie Irvine (born 1965), Northern Irish racing driver
Edith Irvine (1884–1949), American photographer
Fely Irvine (born 1989), Australian musician and television personality known for being a member of Hi-5
Frank Irvine (1858–1931), American judge
Gary Irvine (born 1985), Scottish footballer 
George Irvine (1948–2017), American basketball player and coach
George Irvine (politician) (1826–1897), Canadian lawyer, judge, professor and political figure
Gerard D'Arcy-Irvine (1862–1932), Australian bishop 
Godman Irvine (1909–1992), Canadian-born British politician
Hamish Irvine, British auto racing driver from Scotland
Hans Irvine (1856–1922), Australian politician and winemaker
Hazel Irvine (born 1965), British television presenter
Helen Douglas Irvine (1880–1947), Scottish novelist, historian and translator 
Ian Irvine (born 1950), Australian author
Irvine family, American family of landowners
Jack Irvine (1912–1996), Canadian political figure 
James Irvine (chemist) (1877–1952), British chemist
James Irvine (designer) (born 1958), London-born designer working in Milan
James Irvine (educator) (1793–1835), American university president
James Irvine (Pennsylvania politician) (1735–1819), Pennsylvania soldier and politician 
James Irvine (Quebec businessman) (1766–1829), Canadian businessman and political figure 
Jeremy Irvine (born 1990), British actor
Jessie Seymour Irvine (1836–1887), Scottish musical arranger
Jim Irvine (field hockey) (born 1948), Australian field hockey player 
Jim Irvine (footballer) (born 1940), Scottish footballer
Jock Irvine (born 1944), Australian cricketer
Joseph Irvine, English footballer
Josephus S. Irvine (1819–1876), Confederate major
John Irvine (journalist), Northern Irish journalist
John Irvine (priest) (born 1949), British priest
Kathi Irvine, American statistician
Keith Irvine (1928–2011), American-based interior designer of Scottish descent
Ken Irvine (1941–1991), Australian rugby league player
Lee Irvine, South African cricketer
Leonard Irvine (1906–1973), English cricketer
Lucy Irvine (born 1956), British author
Lyn Irvine (1901–1973), English journalist and writer
Martyn Irvine (born 1985), Irish cyclist
Mat Irvine (born 1948), British television designer
Michael Irvine (born 1939), British politician 
Murray Irvine (1924–2005), British priest
Olive Lillian Irvine (1895–1969), Canadian teacher and politician
Paula Irvine (born 1968), American actress
Reed Irvine (1922–2004), American media critic
Richard Irvine (1910–1976), American art director and Disney employee
Robert Irvine (born 1965), British celebrity chef
Robert Irvine (rugby league), New Zealand rugby league footballer who played in the 1910s
Robin Irvine (1900–1933), British film actor
Sadie Irvine (1887–1970), American artist and educator
Sammy Irvine (born 1956), Scottish footballer 
Scott Irvine (born 1953), Canadian musician 
Ted Irvine (born 1944), Canadian ice hockey player; father of Chris Jericho (above)
Thomas Irvine (1913–1985), British priest
Thomas Alexander Irvine (died 1963), Scottish soldier 
Vernon K. Irvine, American football coach
W. D. Irvine, 1890 American football coach 
Weldon Irvine (1943–2002), American composer
William Irvine (Australian politician) (1858–1943), Australian politician
William Irvine (Canadian politician) (1885–1962), Canadian politician, journalist and clergyman
William Irvine (chemist) (1743–1787), Scottish chemist
William Irvine (lawyer) (1820–1882), American soldier and politician
William Irvine (missionary) (fl.1900–1940), Indian magazine editor
William Irvine (physician) (1741–1804), American politician
William Irvine (Scottish evangelist) (1863–1947)
William Irvine (soldier) (1298–?), Scottish soldier and landowner
William D. Irvine, Canadian writer, historian and academic
Willie Irvine (born 1943), Irish footballer 
Willie Irvine (footballer born 1956) (born 1956), Scottish association footballer
Willie Irvine (footballer born 1963) (born 1963), Scottish footballer and manager
Wilson Irvine (1869–1936), American painter

Given name 
Irvine Arditti (born 1953), British musician
Irvine Barrow (1913–2005), Canadian politician
Irvine Boocock (1890–?), English footballer 
Irvine Bulloch (1842–1898), American naval officer 
Irvine Dearnaley (1877–1965), English cricketer 
Irvine Clifton Gardner (1889–1972), American physicist
Irvine Geddes (1882–1962), Scottish rugby union footballer
Irvine Glennie (1892–1980), British navy officer 
Irvine W. Grote (1899–1972), American chemist and scholar
Irvine Laidlaw (born 1943), Scottish businessman
Irvine Lenroot (1869–1949), American politician
Irvine M. Levine, American physician
Irvine Masson (1887–1962), Australian chemist and educator
Irvine U. Masters (1823–1865), American politician
Irvine Page (1901–1991), American physiologist
Irvine Patnick (born 1929), British politician
Irvine Robbins (1917–2008), Canadian-American entrepreneur, co-founder of Baskin-Robbins
Irvine Robertson (1882–1956), Canadian rower
Irvine Sellar, British property developer
Irvine Shillingford (born 1944), Dominican cricketer 
Irvine Thornley (1883–1955), English footballer 
Irvine Welsh (born 1958), Scottish novelist, best known for Trainspotting

See also
 Clan Irvine, Scottish clan
 Earvin
 Ervin (disambiguation)
 Ervine
 Erving (disambiguation)
 Erwan
 Erwin (disambiguation)
 Irvin
 Irving (disambiguation)
 Irwin (disambiguation)

Scottish masculine given names